Catocala davidi is a moth in the family Erebidae first described by Oberthür in 1881. It lives in northern China.

References

davidi
Moths described in 1881
Moths of Asia